A Special Amphibious Reconnaissance Corpsman (SARC) is a United States Navy hospital corpsman who provides MARSOC and other USSOCOM units advanced trauma management associated with combatant diving and parachute entry. Traditionally, they are attached to the Marine Corps Force Reconnaissance companies to help support the Command Element of the Marine Air-Ground Task Force in special reconnaissance missions.

Mission
SARCs are trained and specialized in the same aspects of special operations as their counterparts: amphibious entry, deep recon and direct action.  They are also capable of conducting detailed underwater ship-bottom searches. During operational status, the teams will then be dispersed evenly throughout the Marine Recon platoons; usually one SARC per platoon. SARCs have regularly acted as a point man, sharp shooter, radio operator, or even the team leader in the Marine Recon teams/platoons. More recently, SARCs are being deployed with Marine Special Operations Command (MARSOC) and select Naval Special Warfare units such as DEVGRU due to their highly advanced skills in combat trauma care and diving medicine.

The environments that Recon Marines and Recon Corpsmen face during a mission are usually hazardous.  The Special Amphibious Reconnaissance Corpsmen use their paramedic skills to provide advanced medical support and other emergency medical procedures related to the hazards of swimming, open and closed circuit SCUBA diving, and military freefall during amphibious reconnaissance operations.  They also instruct and advise the recon Marines in the prevention and treatment of illnesses, whether in combat or training.

The SARC has the duty of hyperbaric chamber operator: skilled in the operation of recompression chambers for hyperbaric treatment. They are also required to know laws and physics of diving, fundamentals of proper gas mixtures, theory and practice of decompression and the use of decompression tables.

 Performs routine sick call, diagnostic patient care as well as associated operational, administrative, and logistical duties.
 Performs basic anesthesia, minor surgical, basic clinical laboratory, basic radiology, and other routine and emergency health care procedures as required.
 Performs advanced trauma procedures in a hostile or combat environment often independently behind enemy lines.
 Instructs and advises junior medical and operational personnel in prevention and treatment of illness and injuries.
 Recognizes all types of illnesses associated with diving to include oxygen toxicity and hypercapnia, nitrogen narcosis, type I and II decompression sickness and air/gas embolism.

Screening and training
As of 2016, a male or female hospital corpsman serving in the paygrades of E-1 (hospitalman recruit) to E-6 (petty officer first class) serving in any capacity may apply for candidacy. It is not required to be currently serving with a Fleet Marine unit to apply. Sailors currently attending Hospital Corpsman "A" School may enter the pipeline immediately without first serving time in the fleet by enrolling in the Special Operations Corpsman Program (SOCP), currently held at HM "A" School. This course is designed to prepare sailors for the lifestyle and training required of candidates applying for SARC, Dive Medical Technician (DMT), and Search-and-Rescue (SAR) programs. Candidates must have a current ASVAB general technical score of 100 or higher.  They also must have passed their last three physical fitness assessments and be able to achieve a first class swim qualification. A commanding officer endorsement is also required, no non-judicial punishments for 12 months and no courts-martial for 24 months. The extensive training requires a commitment to serve as a recon corpsman for a minimum of three years.

Occupational Classification
After completion of Phases 1 & 2 listed below, Corpsman will be awarded the NEC L03A. Following Phases 3-9, Corpsman will be awarded the NEC L11A, Special Amphibious Reconnaissance Corpsmen (SARC).

 Hospital Corpsman “A” School (75 days) - Fort Sam Houston, San Antonio, TX 
 Field Medical Training Battalion - West or East (59 days) - Camp Pendleton, CA or Camp Lejeune, NC 
 Reconnaissance Training Assessment Program (33 days) - Camp Pendleton, CA
 Basic Reconnaissance (BRC) Course (95 days) - Camp Pendleton, CA
 Survival Evasion Resistance Escape (SERE) School - (12 days) - Various Locations 
 U.S. Army Airborne School (21 days) - Fort Benning, GA
 U.S. Marine Combatant Diver (MCD) course (51 days) - Panama City, Fl
 Amphibious Reconnaissance Course (ARC) course (37 days) - Panama City, Fl
 Special Operations Combat Medic (SOCM) course (250 days) - Fort Bragg, NC

Individual Specialty Training
Following this pipeline, the corpsman will be assigned to one of the Marine Corps Reconnaissance Battalions, Force Reconnaissance, MARSOC, or other USSOCOM command in order to be placed with a specific unit. Upon placement, corpsman will receive specialized occupational training in order to become a more qualified component of a team. SARC has many opportunities for schools in their training courses may include; HALO/HAHO military freefall parachuting, Advanced Air Operations: Jumpmaster or Parachute Rigger, Air Assault, Advanced radio communications, Diving Supervisor, Scout Sniper, Advanced Close Quarter Combat/Breacher School, CBRN defense, Language School, Naval Small Craft Instruction and Technical Training School, Surreptitious Entry, Unmanned Aerial Vehicle Operator, Advanced Driving Skills, Tactical Coxswain Course, Tactical Boat Crew Member Course, joint terminal attack controller, Ranger School, and Mountaineering.

SARCs can later gain the Special Operations Independent Duty Corpsman (NEC L02A) qualification. On completion of this advance course, the Corpsman will be able to perform; Advanced Cardiac Life Support (ACLS), advanced paramedical skills, clinical diagnostics, basic surgical anesthesia, basic dental exams, and other routine and emergency medical health care procedures. Supervise and manage critical medical procedures in combat or non-combat environments. This course is similar to the US Army's (SFMS) Special Forces Medical Sergeant (18D) course.

See also

Hospital corpsman
United States Marine Air-Ground Task Force Reconnaissance
United States Marine Corps Force Reconnaissance
United States Marine Corps Reconnaissance Battalions

References

External links
Amphibious Reconnaissance Corpsman - NETC

 
United States Navy ratings